Rudolf Heinrich Daumann (1896 - 1957) was a German journalist and writer.

References

1896 births
1957 deaths
German male journalists
German-language writers
German male writers
20th-century German journalists